Martina Hingis and Leander Paes were the defending champions, but lost in the quarterfinals to Sania Mirza and Ivan Dodig.

Elena Vesnina and Bruno Soares won the title, defeating CoCo Vandeweghe and Horia Tecău in the final,  6–4, 4–6, [10–5].

Seeds

Draw

Finals

Top half

Bottom half

References
 Main Draw

External links
 2016 Australian Open – Doubles draws and results at the International Tennis Federation

Mixed Doubles
Australian Open (tennis) by year – Mixed doubles